"This Woman's Work" is a song written and performed by the British singer Kate Bush. It was originally featured on the soundtrack of the American film She's Having a Baby (1988). The song was released as the second single from her album The Sensual World in 1989 and peaked at 25 in the UK Singles Chart.

Song information
The lyric of "This Woman's Work" is about being forced to confront an unexpected and frightening crisis during the  childbirth. Written for the film She's Having a Baby, director John Hughes used the song during the film's dramatic climax, when Jake (Kevin Bacon) learns that the lives of his wife, Kristy (Elizabeth McGovern), and their unborn child are in danger. As the song plays, a montage sequence of flashbacks is displayed, showing the couple in happier times, intercut with shots of him waiting for news of Kristy and their baby's condition.  Bush wrote the song specifically for the sequence, writing from a man's (Jake's) viewpoint and matching the words to the visuals which had already been filmed.

Tarquin Gotch, who was music supervisor of She’s Having A Baby, says that the temp track for the scene was This Mortal Coil’s cover of “Song to the Siren” by Tim Buckley, but they refused to license the track.

The version of the song that was featured on The Sensual World was re-edited from the original version featured on the film's soundtrack.  The version released as a single was a third, slightly alternate mix.

"This Woman's Work" is one of several songs that were completely re-recorded on her 2011 album Director's Cut. The new version features a sparse performance of Bush singing and playing piano.

Composition

According to the sheet music published in Musicnotes.com by Sony/ATV Music Publishing, the song is set in the time signature of common time, with a slow tempo of 66 beats per minute. It is written in the key of A-flat major with Bush's vocal range spanning from A3 to E5.

Music video
The music video for "This Woman's Work", which was directed by Bush herself, starts with Bush, spotlighted in an otherwise black room, playing the introductory notes on a piano. In the next scene, a distraught man (played by Tim McInnerny) is pacing in the waiting room of a hospital. It is then revealed through flashbacks that his wife (played by Bush) has collapsed while they were having dinner. The story blurs into a continuous scene where he carries her to the car, a desperate race to the hospital, and his wife being wheeled away on a stretcher as he races in behind her. While waiting, the husband is wracked with fear and imagines his wife in happier times, kissing him in the rain, and even imagines the nurse coming to tell him she has died. The nurse then pulls him out of his reverie, as she reassuringly puts her hand on his shoulder and tells him about his wife's situation, though we cannot hear what she is saying. The final scene of the video returns to Bush as she silently covers the piano keyboard.

Use in media
Fifteen years after its original release, in 2005, the song peaked at number 3 in the UK Official Download Chart, due to it being featured in the Tamzin Outhwaite drama Walk Away and I Stumble. Also in 2005, the song featured in an advert for the NSPCC. In 1997, the song was featured in Season 3, Episode 21 of the series "Party of Five" (Hitting Bottom) when Bailey asks Sarah for help after crashing his jeep and injuring her. Due to the song's inclusion in TV series Extras, the song entered the UK chart once again at number 121 in the week ending 5 January 2008, rising to 76 the following week. The song also appears in Season 6, Episode 12 of It's Always Sunny in Philadelphia while Dee Reynolds (Kaitlin Olson) emerges after giving birth to a waiting room full of former romantic acquaintances. After it was performed by a contestant on Britain's Got Talent in April 2012, it re-charted at number 63 on the UK chart. In 2015, the song was used in the first season finale of FX comedy-drama series You're the Worst, sung by the character Lindsay Jillian (Kether Donohue). The song features prominently in the first episode of the second season of The Handmaid's Tale when the lead character faces execution. In May 2021, "This Woman's Work" was featured on the second episode of The Pact, a BBC1 drama series starring Julie Hesmondhalgh. Following this, the track placed at 42 on the UK Official Download Chart. The film A Man Called Otto also features the song.

Track listing
A version of the B-side "Be Kind to My Mistakes" had previously been featured in the film Castaway in 1986. The other B-side, "I'm Still Waiting", features on the 12" and CD single versions only.

7" single (UK)

12" and CD single (UK)

Personnel
Kate Bush – vocals, piano, keyboards
Michael Kamen – orchestral arrangements

Chart performance
"This Woman's Work" was released on 20 November 1989 and reached a peak position of number 25 on the UK Singles Chart. In 2022, "This Woman's Work" was certified gold by the British Phonographic Industry (BPI) for sales and streams in excess of 400,000 units.

Weekly charts

Certifications

Maxwell's versions

In 1997, American R&B musician Maxwell covered the song for the release of his album MTV Unplugged. The artist later re-recorded the song in studio for his album Now (2001). This version of the song was released as the album's third single in 2001 and peaked in the US Billboard charts at number 58 (Billboard Hot 100 in 2002) and number 16 (Hot R&B/Hip-Hop Songs). This version also appeared in the 2000 film Love & Basketball.

The song was featured on week 7 of So You Think You Can Dance (American season 5) (22 July 2009). It was used as the music for a contemporary dance choreographed by Tyce Diorio and performed by contestants Melissa Sandvig and Ade Obayomi.

Critical reception
Larry Flick from Billboard wrote, "Maxwell's "Unplugged" cover of the lilting Kate Bush chestnut is a perfect showcase for his voice—precisely because he only takes full advantage of its depth during a few impassioned moments, teasing us with his potential. The rest of the number is done in falsetto alongside minimalist treble pluckings, a style that expresses convincingly the longing implicit in the lyrics and the melody itself."

Music video
The music video for Maxwell's cover of "This Woman's Work", which was directed by Sanji, begins with pictures of Maxwell and his lover in black-and-white photography. One picture reveals that his lover has died. In the next scene, Maxwell sees the ghost of his lover in the street and proceeding toward her, he falls through the street into a watery grave; seemingly drowning in his sorrow. Maxwell, then begins to swim across the street, pulling himself up by holding onto the sidewalk, he looks up to a cloud that reveals the face of his lover. The next scene shows Maxwell sitting in a diner, reminiscing about the loss of his love. Sitting next to Maxwell, are two women who—shown through flashbacks—have experienced heartache and loss of another kind. The music video ends with Maxwell walking outside of the diner, seemingly still underwater, as he sings "make it go away."

Charts

Weekly charts

Year-end charts

Hope for Isla and Jude cover versions

In 2014 musicians Darren Hayes, Pete Murray, Marlisa Punzalan, Nathaniel and Flea from Red Hot Chili Peppers collaborated to record "This Woman's Work" as Hope for Isla and Jude. The song was recorded to bring hope to Isla and Jude; two young Australian siblings suffering from the rare and fatal disease Sanfilippo Syndrome. Proceeds from the song's went to Sanfilippo Children's Foundation, a not-for-profit charity that dedicates their resources to progressing clinical research into the effective treatment of Mucopolysaccharidosis III, also known as MPSIII or Sanfilippo Syndrome. The song peaked at number 79 on the ARIA Singles Chart

Charts

References

1988 songs
1989 singles
2001 singles
2014 singles
Kate Bush songs
Maxwell (musician) songs
Film theme songs
Songs written by Kate Bush
Music videos directed by Sanji (director)
EMI Records singles
Columbia Records singles
Songs about parenthood
Sony Music Australia singles